Organismic theories in psychology are a family of holistic psychological theories which tend to stress the organization, unity, and integration of human beings expressed through each individual's inherent growth or developmental tendency.  The idea of an explicitly "organismic theory" dates at least back to the publication of Kurt Goldstein's The organism: A holistic approach to biology derived from pathological data in man in 1934.  Organismic theories and the "organic" metaphor were inspired by organicist approaches in biology.  The most direct influence from inside psychology comes from Gestalt psychology.  This approach is often contrasted with mechanistic and reductionist perspectives in psychology.

Examples of organismic theories and theorists
Kurt Goldstein's organismic theory
Ludwig von Bertalanffy's organismic psychology within his general systems theory
Jean Piaget's theory of cognitive development
Heinz Werner's orthogenetic principle of development
Andras Angyal's biospheric model of personality
Abraham Maslow's holistic-dynamic theory
Carl Rogers' person-centered therapy and actualizing tendency
Fritz Perls and Laura Perls's Gestalt therapy
Edward L. Deci and Richard M. Ryan's self-determination theory
Murray Bookchin's dialectical naturalism

See also

Notes

References
 Hall, Calvin & Lindzey, Gardner. (1970).  Theories of Personality.  (Second Edition)
 Maslow, Abraham. Motivation and Personality (1st ed.: 1954, 2nd ed.: 1970)
 Perls, F., Hefferline, R., & Goodman, P. (1951). Gestalt Therapy: Excitement and Growth in the Human Personality.
 Rogers, Carl. (1951). Client-centered therapy: Its current practice, implications and theory. London: Constable. .
 Werner, H. (1957). The concept of development from a comparative and organismic point of view. In D. Harris (Ed.), The concept of development. Minneapolis, Minn: University of Minnesota Press

Further reading
Harrington, Anne: Reenchanted Science: Holism in German Culture from Wilhelm II to Hitler, Princeton University Press, 1999.

Humanistic psychology
Psychological schools